Arebica is a variant of the Arabic script used to write the Serbo-Croatian language. It was used mainly between the 15th and 19th centuries and is frequently categorized as part of Aljamiado literature. Before World War I there were unsuccessful efforts by Bosnian Muslims of the Kingdom of Yugoslavia to adopt Arebica as the third official alphabet for Yugoslavian alongside Latin and Cyrillic.

Apart from literature, Arebica was used in religious schools and administration, though in much less use than other scripts.

Origin
Full letters were eventually introduced for all vowels (as with Kurdish Arabic script), making Arebica a true alphabet, unlike its Perso-Arabic base.

The final version of Arebica was devised by Mehmed Džemaludin Čaušević at the end of the 19th century. His version is called Matufovica, Matufovača or Mektebica.

Contemporary use
The first literary work to be published in Arebica since 1941 was the comic book "Hadži Šefko i hadži Mefko" in 2005, by authors Amir Al-Zubi and Meliha Čičak-Al-Zubi. The authors made slight modifications to Arebica.

The first book in Arebica with an ISBN was "Epohe fonetske misli kod Arapa i arebica" ("The Age of Phonetic Thought of Arabs and Arebica") in April 2013 in Belgrade by Aldin Mustafić, MSc. This book represents the completion of the standardization of Mehmed Džemaludin Čaušević's version, and is also a textbook for higher education.

Alphabet
The final version of Arebica alphabet was devised at the end of the 19th century by Mehmed Džemaludin Čaušević.

Notes

  Mustafić uses  and Al-Zubi and Čičak-Al-Zubi use  for Đ đ/Ђ ђ.

Ligatures 
Like the standard Arabic alphabet, when  connects to either  or  a special ligature is used instead.

Prior to standardization, the most widespread Arebica conventions were based on Ottoman Turkish conventions, and similar to contemporary aljamiado conventions adopted for Albanian and Greek. Vowels are often written using matres lectionis, with the exception of /e/, which is only represented word-finally, as <ە>. /o/ and /u/ are not distinguished. /ɲ/, /ʎ/ and /ts/ were not distinguished from /n/, /l/ and /tʃ/, respectively spelt as <ن>, <ل> and <چ>. Palatal affricates /tɕ/ and /dʑ/ are both typically spelt as <ك>, due to the Persian letter <گ> not having been widely adopted yet, while velar stops /k/ and /g/ are represented with <ق> and <غ>.

Text examples

Universal Declaration of Human Rights, Article 1

Tehran

See also
Aljamiado
Sevdah
Belarusian Arabic alphabet, another script used by Slavic-speaking Muslims
Chirvat-türkisi
Gaj's Latin alphabet
Muhamed Hevaji Uskufi Bosnevi
:Category:Arabic alphabets

External links
 Ottoman Turkish / Arabic keyboard (including Bosnian characters)
 UDHR in Arebica (Bosnian)
 Adnan Tufekčić, Arebica in Bosnia – Short Notes and One Review: From the Treasury of Bosnian Authentic Syncretism, Spirit of Bosnia No 15 (04), 2020

References

 Enciklopedija leksikografskog zavoda, entry: Arabica. Jugoslavenski leksikografski zavod, Zagreb, 1966

Bosnian language
Croatian language
Serbian language
Arabic alphabets